Neo Geo may refer to:

Video games 
 The Neo Geo brand of arcade system boards and video game consoles:
 Neo Geo (system)
 Neo Geo CD
 Hyper Neo Geo 64
 Neo Geo Pocket and Neo Geo Pocket Color

Music 
 Neo Geo (album), a music album by Ryuichi Sakamoto, not related to the games

Art
 An art movement also known as Neo-minimalism
 Neogeo (art)

See also 
 Variable Geo Neo, a Japanese 2D fighting game/eroge series